Magunira Shagada (Magunira's Bullock Cart) is a 2002 Indian Oriya film directed by Prafulla Mohanty. It is based on a short story by Godavarish Mahapatra.  The film won the 2002 National Film Award for Best Feature Film in Odia.

Plot 
The plot revolves around Maguni, who owns and drives a bullock cart. His business of driving people and goods is less efficient than that of the new mini buses, and he is increasingly unable to adapt to the changing circumstances. When his wife catches an illness which she does not survive, Maguni eventually becomes insane and dies.

Cast
Ashru Mochan Mohanty as Maguni
Jaya Seal
Dhirendra Basa
Nila Mani Behera
Manorama Mohanty

Music 
Music Director - Amarendra Mohanty
Lyricist - Shirsananda Das Kanungo
Playback - Suresh Wadkar, Amayendra Mohanty, Sweta Pan, Rudra Mohanty, Arati Goswami

Awards and participation 
International Film Festival of India, 2002 (Indian Panorama section)
National Film Awards 2002, Best Feature Film in Oriya of 2001

References

External links

Review of 'Magunira Shagada' in www.doctorflix.com
 

2002 films
2000s Odia-language films
National Film Development Corporation of India films